Yalovaspor is an association football club located in Yalova, Turkey, playing in the Turkish Regional Amateur League.

History
 
The club was relegated to the Third League after losing to Fatih Karagümrük 4–1 in an away match in Round 29 of the 2010-11 season.

League participations

 TFF First League: 1990–94
 TFF Second League: 1985–90, 1994–2001 (Didn't play in 1999–2000 season due to Marmara earthquake), 2003–07, 2008–09
 TFF Third League: 2001–03, 2007–08, 2009–11
 BAL: 2011–12, 2013–14, 2015–
 Amatör Futbol Ligleri: 1963–84, 2012–13, 2014–15

Current squad 

Source: Maçkolik

References 

 
Association football clubs established in 1963
Sport in Yalova
Football clubs in Turkey
1963 establishments in Turkey